Orland Park 179th Street is one of three stations on Metra's SouthWest Service in Orland Park, Illinois. In Metra's zone-based fare system, 179th Street is in zone F. As of 2018, Orland Park 179th Street is the 162nd busiest of Metra's 236 non-downtown stations, with an average of 208 weekday boardings. The station was the southern terminus of the line from January 3, 1995 to January 30, 2006 when it was extended to New Lenox and Manhattan.

As of January 16, 2023, Orland Park 179th Street is served by all 30 trains (15 in each direction) on weekdays, with 10 inbound trains originating here and 10 outbound trains terminating here. Saturday service is currently suspended.

Although 179th Street is no longer the terminus of the SouthWest Service, most trains end their trips at this station.

References

External links 

Station from 179th Street from Google Maps Street View

Metra stations in Illinois
Railway stations in Cook County, Illinois
179th Street
Railway stations in the United States opened in 1995